Aucamp is a surname. Notable people with the surname include:

Carol Hanks Aucamp (born 1943), American tennis player
Hennie Aucamp (1934–2014), South African poet, writer and academic
William Aucamp (1932–1992), South African water polo player

See also
Aucamp v Morton, a South African contract law case